Ivanjica is a town and municipality located in the Moravica District of southwestern Serbia. As of 2022 census, the municipality has a population of 27,767 inhabitants. With an area of 1090 km2, it is the eighth largest municipality in Serbia.

Situated in the valley of Moravica river, Ivanjica has a predominantly hilly and mountainous terrain. It is surrounded by the mountain ranges of Golija, Javor, Mučanj, Čemerno and Radočelo. The municipality has large potato and raspberry plantations in which many locals are employed. It is also known for the cultural event Nušićijada and as being the birthplace of World War II Chetnik leader, Draža Mihailović.

History
Following the Serbian Revolution which took place in early 19th century, and Serbian liberation from the Ottoman Empire, Ivanjica has gained the status of village in 1833, after the Prince of Serbia, Miloš Obrenović took the area. In 1836, Orthodox church was built in town centre. Ivanjica got the status of a town on 16 June 1866 through the Prince Mihailo Obrenović’s decree, thus becoming one of the first towns in the region.

With the 1878 Congress of Berlin recognition of the independence of Principality of Serbia, King Milan I founded the Kingdom of Serbia. In 1918, Kingdom of Yugoslavia was formed, following the World War I. From 1929 until the beginning of the World War II, Ivanjica was part of Drina Banovina. In August and October 1941 it was briefly captured and held by forces of Pećanac Chetniks commanded by Božidar Ćosović.

With the end of World War II, Ivanjica was part of Užice Oblast. At the time, Ivanjica was the administrative center of so-called Moravica County. That changed in 1963 following the adoption of the 1963 Yugoslav Constitution, when counties were replaced with regions and municipalities, thus creating the municipality of Ivanjica, as a part of Užice District. Since the founding, Ivanjica's population mostly lived in the rural areas, with only 1,532 (4.04%) living in the town, as of 1948. That began to change with the period of industrialisation which hit Ivanjica during the 1960s. That caused the rural population to move to the urban areas of municipality. Until the 1990s urban population made up to 31% of total municipality's population.

Following the Government of Serbia Enactment of 29 January 1992, Ivanjica became part of Moravica District, with the administrative center in Čačak, thus becoming more connected to the region. In 2003, a monument of Draža Mihailović, former Chetniks leader who was born in Ivanjica, was set in town center on his 110th birth anniversary.

Today, Ivanjica is a modern little town and the municipality with around 27,700 citizens. Its economy and development are based on agriculture, lumber industry and tourism.

Geography

Ivanjica lies in the southwest of Serbia, at the bank of the Moravica river. It is surrounded by the mountain ranges of Golija, Javor, Mučanj, Čemerno and Radočelo and is in a valley. Ivanjica's highest elevation is 1833 m, at the Jankov Kamen peak. The mountains in this area belong to the Dinaric range. The local environment includes forests and clearings, pastures, springs and rivers, wild fruit, 'medicinal' herbs and various game.

The river system of the municipality and its neighborhood is made up of clear fast-flowing mountain rivers: the Moravica, the Studenica and the Nošnica which, together with their tributaries, curve down the Moravica mountains. There are and two small lakes: Nebeska Suza and Tičar Lake.

Climate
Ivanjica has a humid continental climate (Köppen climate classification: Dfb), that's very close to an oceanic climate (Köppen climate classification: Cfb).

Settlements
Aside from the town of Ivanjica, the municipality of Ivanjica includes the following 48 settlements:

 Bedina Varoš 
 Bratljevo 
 Brezova 
 Brusnik
 Budoželja
 Bukovica
 Vasiljevići
 Vionica
 Vrmbaje
 Vučak
 Gleđica
 Gradac
 Dajići
 Deretin
 Dobri Do
 Dubrava
 Erčege
 Javorska Ravna Gora 
 Katići
 Klekova
 Kovilje
 Komadine 
 Koritnik
 Kosovica
 Kumanica 
 Kušići 
 Lisa
 Luke
 Mana
 Maskova
 Medovine 
 Međurečje
 Močioci
 Opaljenik
 Osonica
 Preseka
 Prilike
 Ravna Gora
 Radaljevo
 Rovine
 Rokci
 Sveštica 
 Sivčina
 Smiljevac
 Čečina
 Šarenik
 Šume

Demographics

According to the latest official census done in 2011, the municipality of Ivanjica had 31,963 inhabitants. About 36.7% of the municipality's population is living in town of Ivanjica. As of 2022 census, the municipality has a population of 27,767 inhabitants.

Population density of the municipality is 25 inhabitants per square kilometer. There is a trend of population decline since the 1960s. The reasons for this trend are bad economic conditions in Serbia, negative natural increase rate and majority of the older population. Depopulation is typical for villages because of the migrations to urban and other areas. The municipality of Ivanjica has 10,388 households with 3,03 members on average, while the number of homes is 13,469.

Religion structure in the municipality of Ivanjica is predominantly Serbian Orthodox (31,541), with minorities like Atheists (26), Catholics (22), Muslims (15) and others. Most of the population speaks Serbian language (31,658).

The composition of population by gender and average age:
Male - 16,081 (42.19 years) and
Female - 15,882 (44.09 years).

The total of 11,595 citizens have secondary education (36.3%), while the 2,167 citizens have higher education (6.8%). Of those with higher education, 1,182 (3.7%) have university education.

Ethnic composition
Most of Ivanjica's population is of Serbian nationality (98.6%). The ethnic composition of the municipality:

Culture and tourism

Cultural monuments

The Old Bazaar is located in the center of the town and was declared an immovable cultural heritage of great importance in 1987. The center of the town, especially the main street, Milinka Kušića, retains its original appearance dating back to the middle of the 19th century. Most of the structures were built after the Great Fire in 1846, which burned the town to the ground and was stopped after some houses where blown up to prevent the spread of fire. The Old Bazaar was used for a decades as backdrop for movies and TV shows in the golden-age of Yugoslavian cinematography. Promotion of the Old Bazaar as a place for making films started with Soja Jovanović making the first version of Branislav Nušić's Sumnjivo lice, in the 1950s. Later Zdravko Šotra made the TV show Više od igre, and after that, the movies Sok od šljiva and Užička republika. The 19th century ambiance of the area was desirable for these films, and Ivanjica was named "Little Hollywood".

There are several cultural monuments in the area of the Old Bazaar:
Jeremić House - one of the oldest structures in the Old Bazaar, a two-floor building that was one of the twelve buildings saved after fire. The ground floor used to be a manufacturing workshop, while the upper floor functioned as a living space. It is located at the end of boulevard and is one of the symbols of Ivanjica.
Church of St. Emperor Constantine and Empress Helena - immediately after the town was founded, around 1836, construction of the town church started and constructed within three years, with the donations from locals. The first restoration of the church was in the 1850s, and an artist from the time period, Dimitrije Posniković, painted it in 1862. Authentic iconostases were saved and remain today.
Stone Bridge - at the end of the 19th century a single-arched bridge was constructed. The project was designed by engineer Milenko Trudić, and the construction work was by Blagoje Luković from Ivanjica. Stone for the construction was transported from a mine in Rašići. According to local stories, a lack of cement called for the use of 30 thousand chicken eggs to keep the stones together. At the time it was the only single-arched bridge in that part of the Balkans, for which a crossed-wedges system of construction was used. The length of the arches which connect the two coasts is 25 meters. During construction four people died. In their honor, a monument was built in Ivanjica cemetery. Bridge construction ended in 1906.
Kušića han - in the area of the Old Bazaar there is also this object as a symbol of the rural construction of the Moravica area. It is built in mountain style from wood and stone. It used to be a doss-house for travelling traders, which were passing through on the way from Raška and Zlatibor.
Monument of Revolution - it stands across from the Kušića han. The author of this monument is Yugoslav painter Đorđe Andrejević Kun, who was aided by Nada Hude, Miloš Gvozdenović and Ljuba Lah. Records about these artists were saved on a panel on the north side of the monument. The monument is shaped in a slightly curved semi-cylindrical reversed trapeze. It is installed on a rectangular pedestal made from white marble. On the front side there is a mosaic illustration of revolutionaries in a battle storm, made from small ceramic panels. From each side there are marble planters. The mosaic does not contain a written epitaph, only an engraved inscription in marble "1941-1945". The monument was unveiled in 1957.
Moravica Hydroelectric power plant - built in 1911, it started working as the ninth hydro power plant in Serbia. Hydro power plants had 260 hp and illuminated only the town. Siemens generator was transported in Ivanjica on steer harness, which has no railway even today. In 1936, a concrete breakwater was built 9m height and 25m width. In 2011, the appearance of the hydro-power plant was changed, along with a view of a waterfall.

Culture institutions and events
The main cultural institutions in the area include the Ivanjica Culture Centre and the Svetislav Vulović Library.

Some of cultural events are: Hunters’ Fair and Wolf Hunt, Parade of Folk Creative Work - Sounds of Golija, Motorcycle Meetings in Ivanjica, Most Beautiful Love Poem Competition, If May Were All the Time, Parade of Reciters and others.

In 2010, cultural event Nušićijada was renewed by initiative of citizen organization "KudeS" from Ivanjica.

Tourism
The beginnings of the development of tourism in Ivanjica municipality are connected with the 1930s when Ivanjica was proclaimed to be a spa and a climatic place.

Tourists visiting the Ivanjica municipality are drawn by its natural and cultural resources, history and tradition, the identity of numerous sites and the cordiality of Ivanjica's hosts. Ivanjica has a number of tourism sites, including those supporting sports, hunting and fishing, excursion, congress, festival and event tourism. This municipality was proclaimed to be the first air spa in Serbia in January 2000, while Golija Mountain is Biosphere reserve under the UNESCO protection. The municipality has around 1000 beds in classified facilities and around 200 beds in village households, in the town and in the suburbs.

In 1978, the Institute for Specialized Rehabilitation was opened and it operates as a state institution which has both medical and tourist character. Its core activity is medical rehabilitation and provision of services based on recreational medical tourism. Air spa of Ivanjica spreads on 2,165 hectares with 7 hectares belonging to the Institute for Specialized Rehabilitation.

Ivanjica also has several transport links to the Serbian Orthodox Church monasteries of Pridvorica (25 km), Kovilje (28 km) and Studenica (41 km).

Economy and infrastructure
The municipality of Ivanjica, with a total area of 1090 km2, has 49.54% under forests, 47% of arable land and only 3.40% of non-arable land. The economy of Ivanjica municipality is typified by the processing industry, lumber processing, production of textile products and production of raspberry, blackberry and potato.

As of 2012, Ivanjica has a total of 7,728 registered agricultural entities (farmsteads). With 1,800 hectares of raspberry plantations (as of 2017), together with neighboring municipality of Arilje, Ivanjica is the biggest producer of raspberries in Serbia. With 1,000 hectares, potato plantations are the second most cultivated culture in Ivanjica.

During the 1960s many large textile enterprises were opened in Ivanjica, but their production was severely hit during the 1990s Western sanctions on FR Yugoslavia.

Historical statistics
In 1988, Ivanjica had 11,300 employed people (on 37,887 inhabitants), of which 7,100 were employed in processing industry and mining sectors. In 2017, it had 7,471 employed people (on 31,963 inhabitants), of which 2,991 were employed in processing industry and mining sectors.

Ivanjica belongs to group of economically underdeveloped part of Serbia, with the level of GDP in the range of 60% to 80% of the national average. Coverage of imports by exports is 92%. There are 362 active enterprises in the municipality of Ivanjica. Small enterprises make 95% of the total number of enterprises.

Economic preview
The following table gives a preview of total number of registered people employed in legal entities per their core activity (as of 2019):

Infrastructure
The municipality of Ivanjica has 84.47 kilometers of state roads class I, the most in Moravica District, mostly because of its size. It also has 134.3 kilometers of state road class II and 170 kilometers of local roads.

Ivanjica lies on State Road 21 (M 21) which intersects with State Road 23 (Zlatibor Highway) in Požega. Further, the State Road 23 intersects with A2 motorway near Čačak, which is the main and fastest road connection with the capital city of Belgrade. The southern sections of this motorway are under construction and the road is planned to go through Ivanjica as well in the future.

Sport

There are 28 sports clubs in the municipality of Ivanjica. The dominant sports are football, basketball, volleyball, archery and winter sports. According to results, the most successful sport club is a football club FK Javor Ivanjica, which was founded in 1912. In 2012 this football club was celebrating its centenary from club founding. This club was a continuous member of the First League for the last several years. Other popular sport clubs are OK Putevi volleyball club and KK Ivanjica basketball club, playing in the lower, regional leagues of western Serbia.

On the territory of Ivanjica municipality there are 6 football fields, 2 indoor swimming pools, 2 outdoor swimming pools, 3 gyms, one air rifle range, 29 outdoor fields for recreation, one athletics track, one chess hall and 2 sports halls.

Gallery

Notable residents

 Joanikije Nešković (1804–1873), bishop
 Stevan R. Popović (1834–1902), lawyer, economist, professor and statesman
 Svetislav Vulović (1847–1898), writer
 Vojislav Novičić (1866–1917), pilot
 Kirilo Savić (1870–1957), engineer
 Dušan Purić (1873–1914), lieutenant colonel
 Nedeljko Košanin (1874–1934), biologist
 Branislav Stanojević (1893–1967), doctor
 Draža Mihailović (1893–1946), leader of Chetnik movement
 Milinko Kušić (1912–1943), soldier
 Petar Stambolić (1912–2007), politician
 Srboljub Krivokuća (1928–2002), footballer
 Momčilo Ristić (1929–2003), professor
 Tomislav Ladan (1932–2008), essayist
 Nedeljko Parezanović (b. 1932), mathematician
 Ivan Stambolić (1936–2000), politician
 Radoslav Sekulić (1939–2014), businessman
 Vladica Kovačević (1940–2016), footballer
 Petar Krivokuća (b. 1947), footballer
 Snežana Bogosavljević Bošković (b. 1964), politician
 Đorđe Milisavljević (b. 1969), playwright
 Radovan Ćurčić (b. 1972), football coach
 Milovan Milović (b. 1980), footballer
 Ana Subotić (b. 1983), athlete, long-distance runner

See also
 List of places in Serbia

References

Sources

External links

 
 Tourism Organisation of Ivanjica 

 
Populated places in Moravica District
Municipalities and cities of Šumadija and Western Serbia
Spatial Cultural-Historical Units of Great Importance